Niccolò Roselli (active 1556 in Ferrara – 1580) was an Italian painter of the Renaissance period.

Biography
He was also active in Reggio-Emilia. He painted for the Oratorio dell'Annunziata, Ferrara. Baruffaldi attributes to him, among others, the following works in Ferrara:
 Purification of the Holy Mary, Church of Santa Maria Bianca
 St James the Major and portrait of the theologian Father Giovanmaria Verrati, Parish church of San Paolo Carmelitani
 St Leonard and other saints, choir of Church of San Leonardo
 Sant'Alo and Marriage of the Virgin; St Anne, Virgin, Jesus and St Basileus for facade of choir; organ shutters with St Anthony Abbot and Augustine; St Jerome over the entrance to the choir; and Virgin and Angels in the adjacent chapel, all in the church of Sant'Anna
 Ascension of Jesus in Confraternity del Cordone
 Dead Christ for Hospital of Santa Maria Novella
 St Lazarus for altar of the Holy Sacrament, in the church of San Giovanni Battista

References

Date of birth unknown
1580 deaths
16th-century Italian painters
Italian male painters
Italian Renaissance painters
Painters from Ferrara